Manoel Segundo Jardim Júnior (born 12 August 1991 in São Bernardo do Campo) is a Brazilian footballer.

Career
Plays in the Associação Esportiva Jataiense.

Career statistics
(Correct )

Contract
 Goiás.

See also
Football in Brazil
List of football clubs in Brazil

References

External links
 ogol
 soccerway

1991 births
Living people
Brazilian footballers
Goiás Esporte Clube players
Association football forwards
People from São Bernardo do Campo
Footballers from São Paulo (state)
21st-century Brazilian people